Dato' Lilah bin Yasin (born 26 March 1958) is a Malaysian politician. From 2008 to 2013 he was the Member of the Parliament of Malaysia for the Jempol constituency in Negeri Sembilan. He is a member of the United Malay National Organisation (UMNO) party in the governing Barisan Nasional coalition.

In addition, Lilah used to be a member of the State Executive Council of Negeri Sembilan, and held the State Assembly seat of Serting until 2008. He was elected to federal Parliament in the 2008 election, winning the seat of Jempol. In 2013 he returned to the Negeri Sembilan State Assembly, winning the seat of Palong, while the former Negeri Sembilan Chief Minister Mohd Isa Abdul Samad assumed UMNO's nomination for Jempol.

Election results

Honours
  :
  Knight Companion of the Order of Loyalty to Negeri Sembilan (DSNS) – Dato' (1993)

References

Living people
1958 births
People from Negeri Sembilan
Members of the Dewan Rakyat
Members of the Negeri Sembilan State Legislative Assembly
Negeri Sembilan state executive councillors
United Malays National Organisation politicians
Malaysian people of Malay descent
Malaysian Muslims
Malaysian people of Minangkabau descent